Woodlands Train Checkpoint (abbreviated as WTCP, also known as Woodlands CIQ) is a railway station and border checkpoint in Woodlands, Singapore. Located close to the Malaysia–Singapore border, the station is owned by Singapore's Immigration and Checkpoints Authority (ICA) and is operated by the Malaysian railway operator Keretapi Tanah Melayu (KTM) in agreement with the Singaporean authorities.

Constructed from 1992 to 1997, Woodlands Train Checkpoint was opened on 1 August 1998 as the Singapore border control facility for rail passengers. At that time there were no boarding facilities, as northbound passengers heading towards Malaysia were required to clear Malaysia's customs and immigration at Tanjong Pagar railway station, and northbound trains stopped at Woodlands Train Checkpoint for Singapore exit immigration checks only. However, southbound passengers could disembark after clearing Singapore's customs and immigration at Woodlands Train Checkpoint, as they had already cleared Malaysian Immigration at Johor Bahru railway station.

Since 1 July 2011, Woodlands Train Checkpoint has been the southern terminus of the KTM Intercity service. This followed an agreement between Malaysia and Singapore to permanently close Tanjong Pagar railway station. Today, Northbound passengers clear both Singapore's and Malaysia's customs and immigration at Woodlands Train Checkpoint before boarding the train for Malaysia, while southbound passengers clear Malaysian Immigration at Johor Bahru Sentral railway station and Singapore customs and immigration at Woodlands Train Checkpoint.

The planned Johor Bahru–Singapore Rapid Transit System is expected to replace shuttle train services to Woodlands Train Checkpoint by 2026, possibly leading to the station's closure.

Train services
A shuttle train service, known as the Shuttle Tebrau, links Woodlands Train Checkpoint with Johor Bahru Sentral. There are 31 trips daily: 17 trips from Johor Bahru and 14 trips from Woodlands. KTM Intercity train services that previously linked Woodlands Train Checkpoint with various destinations in Malaysia were truncated to terminate at Johor Bahru Sentral following the introduction of the shuttle train service on 1 July 2015.

The Eastern and Oriental Express luxury train has its terminus at Woodlands Train Checkpoint.

Transport connections
Woodlands Train Checkpoint features a domestic public bus stop is served by following public buses: to Kranji MRT station, Marsiling MRT station, Woodlands Bus Interchange at Woodlands MRT station and Woodlands North MRT station. 

In addition, it also features both a domestic taxi stand and a domestic ride-hail (private hire cars) stand. 

A footbridge links the train checkpoint with the Woodlands Checkpoint and the walk takes approximately 7 minutes ( ~500 meters).

Woodlands Train Checkpoint functions as a de facto domestic public bus stop, taxi stand and ride-hail stand (with much higher bus frequencies, bus seat availability and taxi availability) for the Woodlands Checkpoint, as all bus and taxi services that ply through Woodlands Checkpoint itself are fully cross-border transport services.

Border control issues
Until 1998, both Malaysia and Singapore had their customs and immigration facilities for rail passengers at Tanjong Pagar railway station. Singapore decided to relocate its customs and immigration facilities to Woodlands despite Malaysia's unwillingness to vacate the Tanjong Pagar railway station according to the Malaysia–Singapore Points of Agreement of 1990. The ICA ceased operations at Tanjong Pagar and moved into Woodlands Train Checkpoint on 1 August 1998.

While providing immigration facilities for southbound passengers at Johor Bahru, Malaysian Customs and Immigration for northbound passengers remained at Tanjong Pagar, refusing to relocate to either Woodlands or Johor Bahru. This peculiarity resulted in passengers travelling to Malaysia being granted entry to Malaysia before being granted exit from Singapore, which is contrary to international practice. 

To circumvent the problem, Malaysian Immigration officers in Tanjong Pagar did not stamp passports, instead scanning them into a computer system and providing a stamped embarkation/disembarkation card, to be retained until leaving Malaysia. This still posed problems for some visitors when leaving Malaysia due to the lack of a physical endorsement in their passports, especially for those who lost the card while in Malaysia.

The border control issues were resolved in 2010 following an agreement to close the Tanjong Pagar railway station. KTM together with Malaysian customs and immigration relocating their operations to Woodlands Train Checkpoint on 1 July 2011 in agreement with Singapore.

See also
 Rail transport in Singapore
 Keretapi Tanah Melayu
 Eastern and Oriental Express
 Malaysia–Singapore border
 Johor–Singapore Causeway
 Malaysia–Singapore Points of Agreement of 1990
 Bukit Timah railway station
 Tanjong Pagar railway station

Hong Kong
 Shenzhen Bay Control Point
 West Kowloon Station Mainland Port Area

References

Railway stations in Singapore
Railway stations opened in 1998
Railway stations opened in 2011
Malaysia–Singapore border crossings
Juxtaposed border controls